Acesta  is a genus of marine bivalve molluscs in the family Limidae.

Species
The World Register of Marine Species registers 29 species.
Acesta agassizii 
Acesta angolensis 
Acesta arnaudi 
Acesta borneensis 
Acesta bullisi 
Acesta celebensis 
Acesta citrina 
Acesta colombiana 
Acesta cryptadelphe 
Acesta diomedae 
Acesta excavata 
Acesta gabrieli 
Acesta goliath 
Acesta indica 
Acesta lemuriensis 
Acesta marissinica 
Acesta maui 
Acesta mori 
Acesta niasensis 
Acesta oophaga 
Acesta patagonica 
Acesta philippinensis 
Acesta rathbuni 
Acesta saginata 
Acesta smithi 
Acesta sphoni 
Acesta verdensis 
Acesta virgo 
Acesta vitrina

References

Limidae
Bivalve genera